The 1952–53 DDR-Oberliga season was the fifth season of the DDR-Oberliga, the top level of ice hockey in East Germany. Five teams participated in the league, and Chemie Weißwasser won the championship.

Regular season

References

External links
East German results 1949-1970

East
DDR-Oberliga (ice hockey) seasons
1952 in East German sport
1953 in East German sport
Ger